The Brewster Homestead is a historic house at 306 Preston Road (Connecticut Route 164) in Griswold, Connecticut. Built about 1740, it is one of the oldest surviving buildings in the town. The house was listed on the National Register of Historic Places in 2000 by Ron and Kate Bauer.

Description and history
The Brewster Homestead is located in western Griswold, at the northeast corner of Preston and Brewster Roads.  It is a -story wood-frame structure, five bays wide, with two small interior chimneys.  It is finished in vinyl siding, although its original (c. 1740) clapboards are underneath.  A -story ell extends to the rear of the house. The main facade is five bays wide, with the main entrance at the center, sheltered by a late 19th-century hip-roofed porch.  The interior retains a number of original features, including plaster walls, gunstock posts in the framing, and paneled fireplace surrounds.  The basement includes the foundational remains of a large chimney, which was removed in the 19th century, at the same time the original main staircase was replaced.

The homestead stands on what is now a fragmentary remnant of a large property given to Johnathon Brewster, son of William Brewster, a founding elder of the Plymouth Colony, by Uncas, sachem of the Mohegan people. Simon Brewster, a great-great-grandson of William Brewster, developed a  parcel as a farm beginning in 1740, probably building this house near its center at that time. The house remained in the hands of Brewster's descendants until 1996 when Ron and Kate Bauer bought it and ran a beautiful bed and breakfast called Homespun Farm for 15 years.

See also
National Register of Historic Places listings in New London County, Connecticut

References

Houses on the National Register of Historic Places in Connecticut
National Register of Historic Places in New London County, Connecticut
Colonial architecture in Connecticut
Federal architecture in Connecticut
Houses in Griswold, Connecticut